Yoon Sung-Hyo (born 18 May 1962) is a South Korean football manager and former player. He is currently manager of Gimhae FC.

External links

1962 births
Living people
South Korean footballers
Association football defenders
Yonsei University alumni
Busan IPark players
Pohang Steelers players
Suwon Samsung Bluewings players
K League 1 players
South Korea international footballers
South Korean football managers
Suwon Samsung Bluewings managers
Busan IPark managers
People from Gimhae
Sportspeople from South Gyeongsang Province